The Kursum Mosque of Kastoria is a historical Ottoman-era mosque in the town of Kastoria, Western Macedonia, Greece. It is mostly in a ruinous state as little renovation work has been done. It is not open for worship. It took its name from a Turkish word meaning lead, as its dome is covered with lead.

Description 
Kursum Mosque is located near the old center of the city, on Mitropoleos Street. During Ottoman times, Kastoria had a total of seven mosques; Kursum Mosque is the only surviving out of those seven, in a bad condition.

It is difficult to date the exact timeframe it was built, but it is speculated that it was built in the 16th century. Kursum Mosque was the most prominent mosque of the town and it has been argued that it was erected on the site of a previous Byzantine church, which in turn was erected on the site of a pagan temple from ancient times.

It was for about 350-370 years a place of worship until Kastoria was annexed by Greece during the Balkan Wars, whereupon it ceased to function as a mosque. and then it was declared by the Greek State as a protected monument in 1924. The first library of the town of Kastoria was housed inside the mosque for some years beginning in 1925 and then it functioned as a warehouse of antiquities for many decades until recently. Thus, it is the only one that avoided being razed to the ground, as it was of some use, while the other six Ottoman mosques of Kastoria were demolished sooner or later, even though they had all been declared preserved monuments as well.

Left unattended and with little restoration for years, the mosque is mostly ruined. Only the lower half of the minaret is preserved, covered in plant life.

In 2016, three post-graduate students chose Kursum Mosque as the subject of their obligatory thesis within the interdepartmental postgraduate program "Protection, maintenance and restoration of cultural monuments" of the Polytechnic School of the Aristotle University of Thessaloniki. This earned strong reactions from the municipal council of Kastoria, who opposed any talks of restoration works claiming that there was no need as Kastoria no longer had any Muslim communities and that no mosque should be restored in Greece while there were talks in Turkey of converting Hagia Sophia into a mosque.

See also 
 Islam in Greece
 List of mosques in Greece
 List of former mosques in Greece
 Ottoman Greece

Notes

References

Bibliography

External links 
 

Ottoman mosques in Greece
Former mosques in Greece
16th-century mosques
16th-century architecture in Greece
Kastoria
Mosque buildings with domes